Theodore Leroy Ossowski (May 12, 1922 - August 21, 1965) was an American football tackle in the All-America Football Conference for the New York Yankees.  He played college football at Oregon State University and the University of Southern California.

1922 births
1965 deaths
People from Beatrice, Nebraska
Players of American football from Nebraska
American football offensive tackles
Oregon State Beavers football players
USC Trojans football players
New York Yankees (AAFC) players